Yutian may refer to:

 Yutian County, Hebei in Tangshan, Hebei, China
 Yutian County, Xinjiang in Hotan Prefecture, Xinjiang, China
 Yutian, Jiangxi, town in and subdivision of Suichuan County, Jiangxi, China
 Yutian, Fujian (玉田镇), town in and subdivision of Changle District, Fuzhou, Fujian, China
 The pre-Islamic Kingdom of Yutian (Khotan) in modern-day Xinjiang, China